Francesco Canalini (born 23 March 1936) is an Italian prelate of the Catholic Church who spent his career in the diplomatic service of the Holy See.

Biography
Francesco Canalini was born in Osimo, Italy, on 23 March 1936. He was ordained a priest on 19 March 1961.

To prepare for a diplomatic career he entered the Pontifical Ecclesiastical Academy in 1966. His early assignments in the diplomatic service included work at a meeting of the Conference on Security and Co-operation in Europe (CSCE) in 1974.

On 28 May 1986, Pope John Paul II appointed him a titular archbishop and Apostolic Pro-Nuncio to Indonesia. His received his episcopal consecration on 12 July 1986 from Cardinal Agostino Casaroli. Pope John Paul II visited Indonesia while Canalini was nuncio there.

On 20 July 1991, he was named Apostolic Nuncio to Ecuador.

On 5 December 1998, he was appointed Apostolic Nuncio to Australia.

On 8 September 2004, Pope John Paul II named him Apostolic Nuncio to Switzerland and to Liechtenstein. He retired from the diplomatic service in April 2011.

He was later Vicar of the Basilica of Santa Maria Maggiore.

See also
 List of heads of the diplomatic missions of the Holy See

References

External links
Catholic Hierarchy: Archbishop Francesco Canalini 

1936 births
Living people
Pontifical Ecclesiastical Academy alumni
Apostolic Nuncios to Indonesia
Apostolic Nuncios to Ecuador
Apostolic Nuncios to Australia
Apostolic Nuncios to Switzerland
Apostolic Nuncios to Liechtenstein
People from Ancona